Joseph Bloodgood may refer to:

 Joseph Colt Bloodgood (1867–1935), American surgeon
 Joseph Wheeler Bloodgood (1926–1960), member of the Wisconsin State Assembly